Greer Township is one of ten townships in Warrick County, Indiana, United States. As of the 2010 census, its population was 1,883 and it contained 769 housing units.

History
Greer Township was organized in 1853. The township was named for Richard Greer, a pioneer settler.

Geography

Cities, towns, villages
 Elberfeld

Unincorporated towns
 Rosebud at 
 Wheatonville at 
(This list is based on USGS data and may include former settlements.)

Adjacent townships
 Barton Township, Gibson County (north)
 Hart Township (east)
 Campbell Township (south)
 Johnson Township, Gibson County (west)
 Scott Township, Vanderburgh County (west)

Cemeteries
The township contains these four cemeteries: Northview, Susott, Williams and Zion.

School districts
 Warrick County School Corporation

Political districts
 Indiana's 8th congressional district
 State House District 75
 State Senate District 50

References
 United States Census Bureau 2007 TIGER/Line Shapefiles
 United States Board on Geographic Names (GNIS)
 IndianaMap

External links
 Indiana Township Association
 United Township Association of Indiana

Townships in Warrick County, Indiana
Townships in Indiana